Florence Malgoire (born 9 March 1960) is a French classical violinist, pedagogue and conductor.

Biography 
Born in Dugny from a musicians family, Malgoire began her career under the leadership of her father Jean-Claude Malgoire within La Grande Écurie et la Chambre du Roy and of her teacher Sigiswald Kuijken with La Petite Bande. Since 1987, she has held solo violin positions in baroque ensembles such as Philippe Herreweghe's La Chapelle Royale, Christophe Rousset's Les Talens Lyriques, and William Christie's Les Arts florissants.

In 2003, she founded "Les Dominos", an ensemble with variable geometry, specialising in 17th and 18th century music, which performed in Naples, Beaune, Geneva, Lille, etc. To deepen her sonata work, Malgoire co-founded Les Nièces de Rameau, an ensemble oriented towards the chamber music repertoire.

Alongside her solo career, Malgoire is interested in musical direction: after radio in French-speaking Switzerland, for which she was invited to conduct Jean-Philippe Rameau's motets at the Agapé Festival, she conducted Jean-Féry Rebel, Georg Friedrich Haendel and Bach, but also Mozart's Requiem and Heinrich Biber.

European specialist of the ancient violin, Malgoire intervenes from Sablé to Tokyo while passing by the Royaumont Foundation, the Juilliard School of New York, and Rio de Janeiro. Since 2000, she has been teaching ancient violin and chamber music at the Conservatoire de Genève and at the Schola Cantorum de Paris.

Discography 
 1990: Mondonville, Pièces de clavecin en sonates avec accompagnement de violon - Christophe Rousset, harpsichord (3 June 1990, Disques Pierre Verany / Arion) 
 1991: Clérambault, Cantates profanes - Isabelle Poulenard, soprano; Gilles Ragon, tenor; Ensemble Amalia: Philippe Allain-Dupré, flute; Florence Malgoire, violin; Marianne Müller, viol; Aline Zylberajch, harpsichord; Yasunori Imamura, theorbo (1–4 January 1991, Opus 111) 
 1994: Leclair, Récréation de musique pour 2 violons et Basse continue - Les Nièces de Rameau (Disques Pierre Vérany) 
 1995: Purcell, Trio Sonatas in three and four parts - Les Nièces de Rameau (9–12 March 1995, Disques Pierre Verany) 
 1998: Rameau's Pièces de clavecin en concerts - Les Nièces de Rameau (23–24 February 1998, Accord/Universal) 
 2003: CPE Bach, Sonates en trio, Sanguineus et Melancholicus - Les Nièces de Rameau (21–25 October 2002, Zig-Zag Territoires) 
 2005: Bach, Sonatas for violin and obbligato harpsichord (BWV 1014–1019) - Blandine Rannou, harpsichord (5–16 May 1003, Zig Zag Territoires) 
 2011: Jacquet de la Guerre, Sonates pour violon - Ensemble Les Dominos: Guido Balestracci, viol; Blandine Rannou, harpsichord; Jonathan Rubin, theorbo and guitar (October 2010, Ricercar) 
 2011: Biber's Rosary Sonatas - Ensemble Les Dominos: Guido Balestracci, viol, lyrone; Angélique Mauillon, harp; Jonathan Rubin, theorbo, Baroque guitar; Richard Myron, violone; Blandine Rannou, organ (July 2011, Psalmus PSAL 018/3) 
 2012: de Saint George, Plaisir d'aimer, souffrance d'aimer, Romances et sonates - Luanda Siqueira, soprano; Olivier Baumont, harpsichord Benoist Stehlin 1750 and square Longman & Broderip piano-forte, London 1795 (2011, Euromusic/Loreley Production LY046/Harmonia Mundi)
 2012: Couperin, Sonatas - Les Dominos (May 2012, Ricercar RIC 330)
2013: Charpentier, Sonate à 8 H.548, Pour un reposoir H.508, Noël pour les instruments H.531 & H.534, Les Dominos, Les Agréments, Choeur de chambre de Namur. Florence Malgoire, violin and conducting (May 2012, May 2013, Ricercar RIC 338)
 2014: Rameau, Concerts en sextuors - Les Dominos: Stéphanie de Failly, Sue Ying Koang, violins; Simon Heyerick, viola; Claire Giardelli, bass violin; Cyril Poulet, cello; Evolène Kiener, bassoon; Serge Saitta, Amélie Michel, flutes and piccolos; Laurent Stewart, harpsichord; Florence Malgoire, violin and conducting (2014, Ricercar RIC 350)

References

External links 
 
 Florence Malgoire on France Musique
 Florence Malgoire sur le site du conservatoire de Genève
 Un Noël avec Charpentier avec Florence Malgoire (ResMusica)
 Discography
 Florence Malgoire  (Schola Cantorum de Paris)
 
 
 BIBER : Sonates du Rosaire, Florence MALGOIRE & Les Dominos (YouTube)

1960 births
Living people
People from Seine-Saint-Denis
20th-century French women classical violinists
21st-century French women classical violinists
Women conductors (music)
21st-century French conductors (music)